Arshdeep Singh Saini (born 6 October 1997), is an Indian professional footballer who plays as a goalkeeper for Goa.

Career
Singh began his career with the AIFF Elite Academy, playing in various competitions. He soon joined Minerva Punjab of the I-League 2nd Division.

On 21 January 2017, Singh made his professional debut for Minerva Punjab against Shillong Lajong in the I-League. He started and played the full match as Minerva Punjab lost 2–1.

In June 2022, FC Goa completed the signing of Arshdeep Singh on a two-year deal.

Career statistics

Club

Honours

Club
Minerva Punjab
I-League: 2017–18

References

1997 births
Living people
Indian footballers
Footballers from Chandigarh
AIFF Elite Academy players
RoundGlass Punjab FC players
Association football goalkeepers
I-League 2nd Division players
I-League players
Indian Super League players
Odisha FC players